USS Hidatsa (ATF-102) was  during the World War II. The ship was later sold to Colombia as ARC Rodrigo de Bastidas (RM-74). Her namesake is an Indian group of the Sioux Tribe of North Dakota, now living on the Fort Berthold Reservation.

Design and description

The ships' complement consisted of 85 officers and ratings.

The ships had two General Motors 12-278A diesel engines, one shaft.

The Abnaki class was armed with a 3"/50 caliber gun anti-aircraft gun, two single-mount Oerlikon 20 mm cannon and two twin-gun mounts for Bofors 40 mm gun.

Construction and career
The ship was built at the Charleston Shipbuilding & Drydock Co. at Charleston, South Carolina. She was launched on 29 December 1943. The ship was commissioned on 25 April 1944. She was reclassified ATF-102 on 15 May 1944.

Service in the United States Navy 
After shakedown in Chesapeake Bay, Hidatsa departed Norfolk on 3 June 1944 with two floating destroyer workshops in tow and reached Manus Island, Admiralties, via the Panama Canal, Bora bora, and Espiritu Santo on 4 September. On 20 September, Hidatsa towed two pontoon barges to Morotai to be used in docks assembled on that newly taken island. Next, she towed seven more barges to Mios Woendi. Then, as the long Pacific campaign moved steadily northward, the fleet tug departed Mios Woendi on 13 October with a gasoline barge, a crane barge, and a PT drydock in tow, for use in the invasion of the Philippine Islands. As Hidatsa reached Leyte Gulf, scene of the initial landings, on 25 October, she could observe gun flashes from the Battle of Surigao Straits, part of Japan's desperate attempt to deny America the Philippines. But for brief voyages to Manus and Hollandia, Hidatsa remained at Leyte on fire fighting, towing and salvage assignments until 3 January 1945. That day she sailed to participate in the initial landings at Lingayen Gulf, where she remained from 9 to 18 January during the vicious Japanese kamikaze attacks.

Hidatsa next participated in landings at Zambales and Grande Island, where she was active in salvage and towing work. On the morning of 17 February, while returning from the initial assault landings at Corregidor, the tug struck a mine in Mariveles Harbor killing 8 of her crew and injuring another 12. Towed to Subic Bay on 18 February, Hidatsa remained there for repairs and trials until she sailed 2 August 1945 for Manus Island, where she received the welcome news of Japan's surrender. Although the war was over, there was much work to be done, and the fleet tug remained in the Philippines for salvage operations until 7 April 1946.

Reaching San Pedro, California, via Eniwetok and Pearl Harbor, 13 June, Hidatsa engaged in training operations. She returned to the Pacific in 1947 for salvage and towing operations, primarily at Eniwetok and Kwajalein. Hidatsa departed Mare Island for Alaska on 28 August 1947 and spent most of the next 2 months operating in the northern waters. Operations along the California coast, with a February 1948 cruise to Pearl Harbor, occupied Hidatsa until she decommissioned and went into reserve at Long Beach, 5 May 1948.

Service in the Mexican Navy 
In 1962, Hidatsa was transferred to the Maritime Commission, National Defense Reserve Fleet at Suisun Bay, California, where she would later be sold to Colombia on 1 March 1979, as ARC Rodrigo de Bastidas (RM-74).

She was put out of service in 1998.

Awards 
The ship has a total of 2 battle stars throughout her career.

 Navy Unit Commendation 
 China Service Medal (extended)
 American Campaign Medal 
 Asiatic-Pacific Campaign Medal (2 battle stars) 
 World War II Victory Medal 
 Navy Occupation Service Medal (with Asia clasp) 
 Philippines Presidential Unit Citation 
 Philippine Liberation Medal (1 award)

References

External links
NavSource Online: USS Hidatsa (ATF-102)
Hull Number : ATF-102 DEPLOYMENTS - MAJOR EVENTS
USS Hidatsa (ATF 102) Crew List

Hidatsa
Ships built in Charleston, South Carolina
1943 ships
World War II auxiliary ships of the United States
Ships transferred from the United States Navy to the Colombian Navy